Gu Xiaoli (born 28 March 1971 in Liaoning, China) is a Chinese rower. She won a bronze medal in Double sculls with her partner Lu Huali at the 1992 Barcelona Olympic Games.

References

Chinese female rowers
Olympic rowers of China
Rowers at the 1992 Summer Olympics
Rowers at the 1996 Summer Olympics
Olympic bronze medalists for China
Living people
1971 births
Olympic medalists in rowing
Rowers from Liaoning
Medalists at the 1992 Summer Olympics
World Rowing Championships medalists for China
20th-century Chinese women
21st-century Chinese women